Nadia Turner (born January 11, 1977) is an American singer, songwriter, actress and radio/television personality, best known as the eighth place finalist on the fourth season of American Idol.

Career

Pre-American Idol
Turner was a former Miami Dolphins cheerleader in 1996.

In 2000, she sang at the 26th G8 summit to President Clinton and seven world leaders in Okinawa, Japan.

2005: American Idol

2006–present: Post-American Idol 
Since exiting American Idol, Turner has made guest appearances on The Ellen DeGeneres Show, The Tonight Show with Jay Leno, The Tony Danza Show and served as a guest host on The View in December, 2006.

Turner has performed and hosted many charities such as Big Brothers Big Sisters "Big Event" at the American Airlines Arena, UM Sylvester Cancer Foundation, The Pet Project, and SOS Children Village.  She was invited to Kuwait by a bloodline of Kuwait's royal family to perform at a private New Year's Eve party.

Turner also performed at the 30th Anniversary Gala of FIU Biscayne Bay Campus. She hosted and performed at the post-game show at the home opening game of the 2007 season of the Florida Marlins at the Dolphin Stadium, along with fellow Idol contestants Ace Young, Mandisa, Anthony Fedorov, and Jessica Sierra.

Turner's debut album, entitled Standing On Love, is scheduled for an undetermined date, and is currently without a label.

Turner has a lead role in the urban romantic comedy Lord Help Us, which premiered at the Pan African Film & Arts Festival and was released on DVD by Image Entertainment in May 2007.

In 2008, her single "Standing On Love" is part of the Edy's SlowChurned Icecream promotional CD "Hot Tracks" available for free with ice cream purchasing at participating stores. The disc also includes another seven tracks from former Idol performers. It was also released as a single with another song, "Beautiful Man."

In 2021, Turner's daughter, Zaréh, auditioned for American Idol with "Bust Your Windows" by Jazmine Sullivan, where she was unanimously put through to Hollywood. However, she was eliminated after the R&B segment of the "Genre Challenge" round of Hollywood Week after performing "One and Only" by Adele.

Discography

References

External links
  Nadia's Official Website
 

Living people
1977 births
21st-century American actresses
Actresses from Miami
American cheerleaders
American film actresses
American funk singers
American Idol participants
Florida International University alumni
Musicians from Miami
National Football League cheerleaders
21st-century African-American women singers